Alberto Gutman (January 4, 1959 – February 16, 2019) was a Cuban-American politician. Born to a Jewish family in Havana, Cuba, he moved to the United States when he was 6 years old.

Early life 
He lived and went to school in Miami Beach, Florida.

He entered politics and became a member of the Republican Party. He was elected Member of Florida House of Representatives, 1984–92; member of Florida Senate 34th District, 1992–99.

He was a member of the Freemasons, B'nai B'rith, Phi Kappa Phi, and Phi Theta Kappa.

He was married and had two daughters.

Career 

In 1992 he won his first election to the Florida Senate defeating Democrat Kendall Coffey.

Gutman accused his opponent in the 1998 senatorial election of using voodoo against him after Santería paraphernalia was tossed at him and scattered on his vehicle by his opponent's supporters; Gutman won the election.

Resignation and Conviction 
He was indicted on 32 counts for benefiting from a fake health care company that he had set up to defraud Medicare of $15,000,000. Gutman then resigned his post as Chairman of the Florida Senate Health Care Committee over alleged improprieties in brokering a Medicaid health plan during his term as vice chairman of the committee.

He was charged with conspiracy, money laundering, and witness tampering. He was found guilty and sentenced to five years in prison with three year’s probation, ordered to pay victims $98,175 in restitution and fined $50,000. (1999)

Death
Gutman died on February 16, 2019, at his home in Miami, Florida.

Electoral history

References

External links 
 Project Vote Smart – Alberto Gutman (FL) profile
 Our Campaigns – Alberto Gutman (FL) profile
 "Governors pledge to reach out and touch", Chuck Shepherd, Orlando Weekly, November 30, 1998.
 "All-American Al", BILL DURYEA, St. Petersburg Times, April 14, 2000

|-

1959 births
2019 deaths
American people of Cuban-Jewish descent
Cuban emigrants to the United States
Miami Dade College alumni
University of Miami Business School alumni
Republican Party Florida state senators
Republican Party members of the Florida House of Representatives
Florida politicians convicted of crimes
American politicians of Cuban descent
Jewish American state legislators in Florida
21st-century American Jews
Hispanic and Latino American state legislators in Florida